Jews for Israeli–Palestinian Peace, abbreviated as JIPF, is a Stockholm-based association, founded by Swedish Jews in 1982, following the Israeli invasion of Lebanon.

Activities and advocacy 
JIPF states that they want to work for a "fair and lasting peace" in the conflict between Israelis and Palestinians, based on national self-determination and independence for both peoples. Its political programme include demands for a creation of a Palestinian state, Israel's withdrawal from all territories occupied in 1967, the dismantlement of Israeli settlements and that the Palestinian refugee question must be based on the principle of the right of return or economic compensation.

With a grant from the Helena Berings Minnesfond (English: Helena Berings Memorial Fund) the group co-ran a school program in partnership with the Palestinian Association of Sweden. The program facilitated dialogues between Palestinians and Jews in approximately fifty schools over three years.

Notable members 
Dror Feiler is the chairman of the organization. Other members include Izzy Young, the journalist Annika Thor and the pediatrician Henry Ascher.

References

External links
 Official website

Jewish anti-occupation groups
Jewish political organizations
Non-governmental organizations involved in the Israeli–Palestinian conflict
Jews and Judaism in Sweden
Organizations established in 1982
1982 establishments in Sweden